Graeme Morris may refer to:
 Graeme Morris (cricketer)
 Graeme Morris (game designer)

See also
 Grahame Morris, British politician
 Graham Morris, British diver